Rostom Aramovic Alagian (1916–2009) was an Armenian-Georgian composer and musician.

His father Aram Alagian was an Armenian from Istanbul. His mother Eleni Pozidou was Greek, also from the same city.

Rostom Alagian was born on 20 of May 1916 in Tbilisi, Georgia and died in Yerevan on 13 of April 2009. He studied composing at the Military Music Academy of Moscow under Dmitri Shostakovich.

From 1939 until 1946 he fought as a captain of the special forces of the Soviet Union Army in the territories from Manchuria to Crimea against the German fascists. The Soviet Union honoured him many times for his services at the Great Patriotic War.

From 1962 was president of the Veteran War Council of the 1941 war. Alagian was also for many years general director of the orchestras in Vladicaucas, Georgia and Armenia. His works were performed in Moscow, Tbilisi, Erevan and elsewhere. He composed great poets like Alexander Blok, Robert Rozhdestvensky, Glan Onanian etc. He wrote cantatas, elegies and various songs. He wrote the symphonic poem Crimea - Stalingrad - Pribaltica (released by Melodia of Moscow in 33" disks). Also the cantata Lime Flame Of Memory for readers, soloists, great symphonic orchestra and chorus. His last greatest symphonic work Alexander The Great, Hymn To The Ancient Greece which is wedding present to his daughter Louisa and his son-in-law Christo Voulgaridi was written in 1996 at Thessaloniki which had many times visited.

He composed one fanfarn Mars specially for the 1500 years anniversary of Tbilisi, Mars Moscow - Berlin for the 70 years of the October Revolution and some others for the youth. His music's morphology, tone and color comes from archegone womb of his eastern origin.

Discography

References
Louisa and Christos Voulgaridis
http://www.exlibris-oldbooks.com

State Orchestra of Thessaloniki 23-12-1996

1916 births
2009 deaths
Composers from Georgia (country)
Soviet composers